23 Years: A Study of the Prophetic Career of Mohammad is a book written by the Iranian author Ali Dashti.

The book contains criticism of the Quran:

References

Biographies of Muhammad